Source Interlink is an American magazine publishing and logistics company. It owns Source Interlink Distribution and Motor Trend Group. It maintains a strong position in automotive and action sports media, publishing a variety of magazines including Motor Trend, Hot Rod, and the Transworld titles.

History
In September 2012, it was announced that Source Interlink Media (SIM) made a strategic investment in San Francisco technology company CoverHound to power its insurance searches.

Through its GrindMedia action sports division, SIM signed a deal with the Bonnier Corporation in May 2013, where they sold Dirt Rider, Motorcyclist, Sport Rider, Motorcycle Cruiser, Hot Bike, Baggers, Super Streetbike, Street Chopper and ATV Rider, whereas they bought Sound + Vision and the suite of TransWorld brands.

On August 19, 2013, GrindMedia announced that production of Skateboarder will cease on October 15, 2013. The Skateboarder announcement was followed by the closure of other publications, such as Modified, Mini Truckin', Bound By Ink, GEEK, and Law of Attraction, in January 2014. Former Skateboarder editor-in-chief Jamie Owens was announced as the new editor-in-chief of TransWorld SKATEboarding in October 2013.

On May 29, 2014, Source Interlink CEO Michael L. Sullivan announced that its distribution arm would soon cease operations. Time, Inc. had withdrawn its business over the inability of Source Interlink Distribution to pay $19 million in revenues owed for second quarter 2014 sales and $7 million for sales booked in previous quarters. The publishing arm would be rebranded under the umbrella of TEN: The Enthusiast Network after shuttering several Source Interlink Media titles, including Popular Hot Rodding, Rod & Custom, High Performance Pontiac, Custom Classic Trucks, 4 Wheel Drive & Sport Utility, Mud Life, 5.0 Mustangs and Super Fords, Modified Mustangs & Fords, Camaro Performers, GM High-Tech Performance, Import Tuner, and Honda Tuning.

In addition to editorial staff, there were further layoffs in art and production staff that was later explained by VPs and executives as needed cuts to keep TEN on a sustainable path since losing the large distribution arm of its core business to reach the claimed audience in its dwindling circulation and online presence.

Publications and digital assets 

  Analog Planet
 Automotive.com
 Baseball America
 CarDomain
 Four Wheeler
 Hot Rod
 Motor Trend
 Off-Grid (parent is RECOIL)
 RECOIL
 SLAM
 Sound and Vision
 Stereophile

Previous 

 8-Lug HD Truck magazine - ceased publication 2015
 Audiostream  - ceased publication 2018
 Automobile - ceased publication 2020 
 Bike - ceased publication  2020
 Bound by Ink - ceased publication 2014
 Canoe & Kayak - ceased publication 2017
 Car Craft- ceased publication 2019
 Chevy High Performance- ceased publication 2019
 Circle Track- ceased publication 2012
 Classic Trucks- ceased publication 2019
 Diesel Power- ceased publication 2019
 Dirt Sports -ceased publication 2018
 European Car- ceased publication 2019
 Geek- ceased publication 2014
 Innerfidelity - ceased publication 2018
 Intellichoice - ceased publication 2012
 Jp- ceased publication 2019
 Law of Attraction Magazine - ceased publication 2013
 Lowrider- ceased publication 2019
 Mini Truckin - ceased publication 2014
 Mopar Muscle- ceased publication 2019
 Muscle Mustangs & Fast Fords- ceased publication 2019
 Mustang Monthly- ceased publication 2019 
 Off-Road- ceased publication  2019
 Petersen’s PHOTOgraphic - ceased publication 2013
 Petersen's 4-Wheel & Off-Road- ceased publication 2019
 Powder - ceased publication 2020
 Shutterbug - ceased publication 2019
 Snowboarder - ceased publication 2019
 Street Rodder- ceased publication 2019
 SUP Stand Up Paddler - ceased publication 2020
 Super Chevy- ceased publication 2019
 Super Street- ceased publication 2019
 Surfer - ceased publication 2019
 Surfing Magazine - ceased publication 2017
 TransWorld Business- ceased publication 2019
 TransWorld Motocross- ceased publication 2019
 TransWorld Ride BMX - ceased publication2019
 TransWorld SKATEboarding- ceased publication 2019
 TransWorld SNOWboarding - ceased publication 2019
 Truck Trend- ceased publication 2019
 Truckin' Magazine- ceased publication 2019
 Vette- ceased publication 2019

See also
Skateboarding
Surfing
Publishing

References

External links 

Sports magazines published in the United States
Automobile magazines published in the United States
Magazines established in 1995
Magazine publishing companies of the United States
Monthly magazines published in the United States
Companies based in Florida
Bonita Springs, Florida
Magazines published in Florida
1995 establishments in Florida
Companies that filed for Chapter 11 bankruptcy in 2009
Companies that filed for Chapter 11 bankruptcy in 2014